Qarangi-ye Jangal (also Romanized as Qarangī-ye Jangal; also known as Qarang Jangal, Karak Jīnkal, Qarānkī Jangal, Qarānkī-ye-Jangal, and Qarnag-e Jangal) is a village in Zavkuh Rural District, Pishkamar District, Kalaleh County, Golestan Province, Iran. At the 2006 census, its population was 814, in 147 families.

References 

Populated places in Kalaleh County